Ab Garmeh or Abgarmeh may refer to:

Khuzestan Province
Ab Garmeh, Lali, a village in Khuzestan Province, Iran

Lorestan Province
Ab Garmeh, Kuhdasht, a village in Lorestan Province, Iran
Ab Garmeh-ye Bar Aftab, a village in Lorestan Province, Iran
Ab Garmeh-ye Nesar, a village in Lorestan Province, Iran

See also
Abgarm (disambiguation)
Ab Garmu (disambiguation)